Chrysogaster solstitialis is a European species of hoverfly.

Description

External images For terms see Morphology of Diptera

Wing length 6-7·25 mm. 
Antennae reddish. In front view the distance between the eyes at most equal to the width of an eye. Wings blackish-tinged. Female thorax with purplish reflections. The male genitalia are figured by Maibach, A. & Goeldlin de Tiefenau (1994). 
 
 

The larva is illustrated by Rotheray (1993).

Distribution
Palaearctic. Ranges from Fennoscandia South to Iberia and the Mediterranean basin, including North Africa. From Ireland Eastwards through of Europe into European parts of Russia, Ukraine and the Caucasus mountains.

Biology
Habitat:Wetland and deciduous forest, woodland streams and ponds including Salix carr.
Flowers visited include white umbellifers, Cornus, Filipendula, Galium, Sambucus, Senecio jacobaea. The flight period is June to September ( May in southern Europe). The larvae live in pond mud containing debris of fallen twigs and branches.

References

External links
Biolib

Diptera of Europe
Eristalinae
Insects described in 1817
Taxa named by Carl Fredrik Fallén